Galeria Jurajska is a shopping mall in Częstochowa, Poland. Opened on 3 October 2009, it was built on the site of two old paper and roller mills of Berka Charles Ginsberg and Kohn, alongside a canal constructed as part of regulation of the Warta River.

External links 
 
 Official Website in English

Shopping malls in Poland
Buildings and structures in Częstochowa
2009 establishments in Poland
Shopping malls established in 2009